Janet Elizabeth Arnott (née Laliberte; April 17, 1956 – June 24, 2019) was a Canadian world champion curler and Olympic champion coach.

Curling career
Arnott was the longtime lead for her sister, Connie Laliberte winning the Scott Tournament of Hearts in 1984, 1992 and 1995 and the World Curling Championships in 1984. With Laliberte, Arnott had played in eight national championships (1984, 1992, 1993, 1994, 1995, 1996, 1999, and 2000).

After Laliberte retired from curling in 2000, the team's then third, Cathy Overton-Clapham took over as skip. Laliberte returned to competitive curling in 2001, with Overton-Clapham forming her own team. Arnott joined her sister as her second for the next few seasons.

Arnott replaced Dana Allerton on the Jennifer Jones team midway through the 2006-07 season amidst some outcry from the curling community. After playing with them at the 2007 Scotties Tournament of Hearts, she was replaced by Dawn Askin as Jones' lead. In 2007, Arnott became the coach of the team before being replaced by Earle Morris in 2010. For the 2010-11 season, Arnott remained part of the team, serving as their alternate at the 2011 Scotties Tournament of Hearts. After Morris left Team Jones to coach the Rachel Homan team in 2011, Arnott returned to coaching the team. She was the team's coach when they won the gold medal at the 2014 Winter Olympics. She was replaced as the team's coach in 2014 by Wendy Morgan.

Arnott was inducted into the Canadian Curling Hall of Fame in 2000 and the Manitoba Curling Hall of Fame in 2002.

Personal life
Janet Elizabeth Laliberte was born on April 17, 1956, in Winnipeg, Manitoba, to Jean and Gus Laliberte. She lived all of her life in the city's St. Vital neighbourhood. She graduated from Dakota Collegiate and completed certificates in Business Accountancy and Business Administration from Red River Community College.

She married Doug Arnott and adopted his surname. She worked at Shoppers Drug Mart until retiring in 2016. She died of cancer on June 24, 2019.

References

External links
 
 Heart Chart - Sault Star, 2011

1956 births
2019 deaths
Canadian curling coaches
Canadian women curlers
Canadian women's curling champions
Curlers from Winnipeg
Deaths from cancer in Canada
Olympic coaches
Red River College alumni
World curling champions
People from St. Vital, Winnipeg
20th-century Canadian women